Fernando Pereira de Almeida (born August 3, 1985 in São Caetano do Sul, São Paulo) is a Brazilian sprinter, who specialized in the 400 metres. De Almeida represented the host nation Brazil at the 2007 Pan American Games in Rio de Janeiro, where he placed sixth for the national sprint team in the men's 4 × 400 m relay, with a time of 3:05.87.

At the 2008 Summer Olympics in Beijing, de Almeida competed for the men's 400 metres this time, as an individual athlete. He ran in the third heat against seven other athletes, including Costa Rica's Nery Brenes and Nigeria's James Godday. He finished the race in fifth place by approximately one sixth of a second (0.16) ahead of Zimbabwe's Lewis Banda, with a time of 46.60 seconds. De Almeida, however, failed to advance into the semi-finals, as he placed forty-sixth overall and was ranked below three mandatory slots for the next round.

References

External links

Profile – UOL Esporte 
NBC 2008 Olympics profile

1985 births
Living people
People from São Caetano do Sul
Brazilian male sprinters
Olympic athletes of Brazil
Athletes (track and field) at the 2007 Pan American Games
Athletes (track and field) at the 2008 Summer Olympics
South American Games gold medalists for Brazil
South American Games medalists in athletics
Competitors at the 2006 South American Games
Pan American Games athletes for Brazil
Sportspeople from São Paulo (state)